
The Gulfstream American Peregrine 600 was a military trainer aircraft developed in the United States in the early 1980s but which did not progress further than prototype stage. Developed from the company's Hustler business aircraft, the Peregrine shared the same wings, empennage and rear fuselage, but had a new forward fuselage with side-by-side seating for the pilot and instructor. The aircraft was developed as a contender in the United States Air Force's Next Generation Trainer program, but was ultimately passed over in favor of the Fairchild T-46. Attempts to market it to (at least) the air forces of Australia, New Zealand, Japan, and China also proved unsuccessful, and the project was canceled in 1985. The wing and rear fuselage design was incorporated in the Gulfstream Aerospace Peregrine business aircraft.

Variants 
 Peregrine A The Peregrine offered with side-by-side seating and a single  Pratt & Whitney Canada JT15D-4 turbofan.
 Peregrine B The Peregrine offered with tandem seating and two  Williams WR44 turbofans.

Specifications (Peregrine A)

See also

References

Sources

External links
 

Cancelled military aircraft projects of the United States
Peregrine 600
Single-engined jet aircraft
1980s United States military trainer aircraft
Aircraft first flown in 1981